Ferdinand Steiner was a gymnast from Bohemia in what is now the Czech Republic.

He took part in the World Gymnastics Championships in 1909, 1911 and 1913. In 1909, he won gold in the team combined competition. In 1911, he won gold in both the team event and in the combined event, and also took gold in the rings and bronze in the horizontal bar. At this World Championships, the Bohemians dominated the team event, and took the top four places in the overall competition. At his last World Championships, in 1913, he again took gold in the team competition.

Steiner introduced an element, the inverted cross, a move that is still valued as a "C"-difficulty element in the current Code of Points, if not much higher, depending upon the movement from which it is entered.

Since medal winners who represented the Austro-Hungarian Empire came from Bohemia, these medals were later transferred to Czechoslovakia by the FIG.

After Steiner's competitive career was over, he was a very reputable trainer of his fellow Czechoslovakian Sokol gymnasts.

References

Czech male artistic gymnasts
Bohemian people
Year of birth missing
Year of death missing
Place of birth missing
Place of death missing